The canton of Isigny-sur-Mer is a former canton of the Calvados département in northwestern France. It had 10,172 inhabitants (2012). It was disbanded following the French canton reorganisation which came into effect in March 2015. It consisted of 24 communes, which joined the canton of Trévières in 2015. Its chief town was Isigny-sur-Mer.

The canton comprised the following communes:

 Asnières-en-Bessin
 La Cambe
 Canchy
 Cardonville
 Cartigny-l'Épinay
 Castilly
 Cricqueville-en-Bessin
 Deux-Jumeaux
 Englesqueville-la-Percée
 La Folie
 Géfosse-Fontenay
 Grandcamp-Maisy
 Isigny-sur-Mer
 Lison
 Longueville
 Monfréville
 Neuilly-la-Forêt
 Osmanville
 Les Oubeaux
 Saint-Germain-du-Pert
 Saint-Marcouf
 Sainte-Marguerite-d'Elle
 Saint-Pierre-du-Mont
 Vouilly

References

Isigny-sur-Mer
2015 disestablishments in France
States and territories disestablished in 2015